The Order of Parental Glory is a state award of the Russian Federation.  It was established on May 13, 2008 by presidential decree 775 to reward deserving parents of exceptionally large families.  It can trace its origins to the Soviet Order "Mother Heroine".  The Order's statute was amended on September 7, 2010 by presidential decree 1099, the same document that established the Medal of the Order of Parental Glory.

Award statute 
The Order of Parental Glory is awarded to parents or adoptive parents who are married, in a civil union, or in the case of single-parent families, to one of the parents or adoptive parents who are/is raising, or have raised seven or more children as citizens of the Russian Federation. For leading a healthy family life, being socially responsible, providing an adequate level of health care, education, physical, spiritual and moral development of the children, full and harmonious development of their personality, and setting an example to strengthen the institution of the family and child rearing.

The award is made when the seventh child reaches the age of three, and in the presence of the other living children, except in the cases of older children who were killed or missing in action in defence of the Fatherland or its interests, in the performance of military, official or civic duties, who died as a result of injury, concussion or disease received in these circumstances, either because of occupational injury or illness.

The Russian Federation Order of Precedence dictates that the Order of Parental Glory is to be worn on the left breast with other orders and medals immediately after the Order of Friendship.

Award description 
The badge of the Order is a 70 mm wide gilt silver cross pattée, with arms that are flared towards the concave outer ends.  The cross obverse is enamelled in blue. At its center is a circular red enamelled medallion edged in gold and bearing the gilded coat of arms of the Russian Federation.  A green enamelled laurel wreath passes under and near the outer ends of the cross.  Golden rays extend between the cross's arms to the laurel wreath.  The reverse is plain (golden) and bears the award serial number.

A smaller 40 mm wide badge of the Order is also given for wear in special circumstances. The gentlemen's badge is suspended by a ring through the badge suspension loop from a standard Russian pentagonal mount covered by a 24 mm wide overlapping white silk moiré ribbon with two 1,5 mm wide light blue stripes situated 8 mm from the ribbon outer edge.  The ladies' badge hangs from a bow made of the same ribbon. Both are worn on the left breast.

Recipients of the Order of Parental Glory (partial list)
The individuals listed below were awarded the Order of Parental Glory.

Vladimir and Galina Belyaeva – June 1, 2009
Yuri and Svetlana Druzhinin – June 1, 2009
Anatoly and Helen Kitaev – June 1, 2009
Sergei and Elena Kitka – June 1, 2009
Sergey and Vera Malikov – June 1, 2009
Gabriel and Marina Medvedev – June 1, 2009
Sergey and Nadezhda Nikolaev – June 1, 2009
Abdulkhalik and Hanpira Khalikova – January 13, 2009
Nicholas and Xenia Lyovka – January 13, 2009
Ildar and Ramzi Gabsalyamov – January 13, 2009
Vladimir and Olga Maksimov – January 13, 2009
Andrei and Svetlana Maltsev – January 13, 2009
Ivan and Nadezhda Osyaki – January 13, 2009
Ivan and Elena Novikov – January 13, 2009
Vladimir and Nadezhda Popov – January 13, 2009
Nikolai and Tatyana Saltykov – June 2, 2010
Nikolay and Lyudmila Nikolenko – June 2, 2010
Konstantin and Svetlana Rozenko – June 2, 2010
Valery and Nadia Isiny – June 2, 2010
Alexander and Tatiana Vasilyev – June 2, 2010
Nicholas and Natalya Arkhipov – June 2, 2010
Cyril and Julia Voroshilov – June 2, 2010
Mudaris and Dilbyar Shafigullin – June 2, 2010
Nadezhda and Ivan Pinchuk – June 1, 2011 
Irina and Sergei Levin – June 1, 2011
Mary and Andrew Gamm – June 1, 2011
Irina and Vladimir Makhovym – June 1, 2011
Irae Gil'mutdinov and Constantine Goloshchapov – June 1, 2011
Olga and Ivan Sukhov – June 1, 2011
Inessa and Eugene Fisenko – June 1, 2011
 Valeriy and Tatiana Novik – May 31, 2017

Medal of the Order

The Medal of the Order of Parental Glory was established on September 7, 2010 by presidential decree 1099.  Its award criteria differ from those of the main Order only in the number of children required.  The Medal of the Order of Parental Glory is awarded for raising four children, as opposed to seven for the Order, and the remainder of the statute is the same.

The Medal of the Order of Parental Glory is made of gilt silver and is 32mm in diameter.  The obverse has a reproduction (without enamels) of the badge of the Order of Parental Glory.  The reverse is plain with the central inscription "FOR RAISING CHILDREN" (Russian: "ЗА ВОСПИТАНИЕ ДЕТЕЙ").  The medal hangs from the same mount and ribbon as the Order's smaller badge destined for wear.

The Russian Federation Order of Precedence dictates that the Medal of Parental Glory is to be worn on the left breast with other medals immediately after the Medal "For Merit in Space Exploration".

See also
Awards and decorations of the Russian Federation
Awards and decorations of the Soviet Union
Order of Maternal Glory
Cross of Honor of the German Mother
Médaille de la Famille française

References

External links
The Commission on State Awards to the President of the Russian Federation
Site of the President of the Russian Federation
The Russian Gazette

Civil awards and decorations of Russia
Orders, decorations, and medals of Russia
Russian awards
Natalism
Awards established in 2010
Awards established in 2008